Youngina is an extinct genus of diapsid reptile from the Late Permian Beaufort Group (Tropidostoma-Dicynodon zones) of the Karoo Red Beds of South Africa. This, and a few related forms, make up the family Younginidae, within the Order Eosuchia (proposed by Broom in 1914). Eosuchia, having become a wastebasket taxon for many probably distantly-related primitive diapsid reptiles ranging from the Late Carboniferous to the Eocene, Romer proposed that it be replaced by Younginiformes (that included Younginidae and the Tangasauridae, ranging from the Permian to the Triassic).

Youngina is known from several specimens. Many of these were attributed to as separate genera and species (such as Youngoides and Youngopsis), but it was later realized that they were not distinct from Y. capensis. The holotype specimen of Youngina was described briefly in 1914. The "Youngoides romeri" specimen was first attributed to Youngina, but later given its eponymous and separate designation in a later paper. Acanthotoposaurus is also a junior synonym of Youngina.

Youngina was once thought to be closely related to Acerosodontosaurus, and more distantly to tangasaurids (Kenyasaurus, Hovasaurus, Thadeosaurus, and Tangasaurus), but the monophyly of  has not been demonstrated in published analyses of diapsid reptiles, and it is likely this group is paraphyletic. Acerosodontosaurus is probably closer to other former , rather than being closely related to Youngina. Below is a cladogram from the analysis of Reisz et al. (2011) showing the phylogenetic position of Youngina among early diapsids:

Youngina could have been a moderately sized early reptile (skull length < ), comparable to size to some medium-sized monitor lizards such as Gould's monitor. The braincase anatomy was redescribed in 2010, and Youngina shows a mosaic of features found in more primitive diapsids and more derived taxa such as archosauromorphs and lepidosauromorphs suggesting a non-orthogenetic evolution of these characters. Though the palatobasal articulation is open, it was probably immobile, similar to the skull of the tuatara, contrary to some earlier claims made about the metakinetic mobility of basicranial joints in Youngina and other early diapsid reptiles.

References 

Prehistoric neodiapsids
Prehistoric reptile genera
Lopingian reptiles of Africa
Lopingian genera
Permian South Africa
Fossils of South Africa
Fossil taxa described in 1914
Taxa named by Robert Broom